Zatrephes bilineata is a moth of the family Erebidae. It was described by Walter Rothschild in 1909. It is found in Peru, Brazil and Colombia.

References

 

Phaegopterina
Moths described in 1909